Mikołajowice may refer to the following places in Poland:
Mikołajowice, Lower Silesian Voivodeship (south-west Poland)
Mikołajowice, Lesser Poland Voivodeship (south Poland)